Cim is a suburban neighborhood of Mostar, Bosnia and Herzegovina. Its population in 2013 was 3,061.

Demographics 
According to the 2013 census, its population was 3,061.

See also
 Cim (archaeological site)

References

Populated places in Mostar